Come with Me may refer to:

 Come with Me (TV series), a 2016 TVB produced TV series
 Come with Me (EP), a 2008 EP by Bobby Valentino
 Come with Me, an album by Tania Maria

Songs 
 "Come with Me" (Dappy song), featuring Dawood, Retro, and Margs, 2012
 "Come with Me" (Koda Kumi song), 2003
 "Come with Me" (Puff Daddy song), featuring Jimmy Page, 1998
 "Come with Me" (Ricky Martin song), 2013
 "Come with Me" (Sammie song), 2007
 "Come with Me" (Waylon Jennings song), 1979
 "Come with Me" (Phil Collins song), 2003
 "Come with Me (Pure Imagination)", a 2016 song by Karmin
 "Come with Me", by Amerie from Touch
 "Come with Me", by Flo Rida from Only One Flo (Part 1)
 "Come with Me", by The Belmonts
 "Come with Me", by Britt Love
 "Come with Me", by Chalk Circle from The Great Lake
 "Come with Me", by Denise Lopez from Slave to the Sound
 "Come with Me", by Donavon Frankenreiter from Pass It Around
 "Come with Me", by Donna Summer from A Love Trilogy
 "Come with Me", by Echosmith from Talking Dreams
 "Come with Me", by Flo Rida from Only One Flo (Part 1)
 "Come with Me", by Graham Nash from Songs for Survivors
 "Come with Me", by Information Society from Hack
 "Come with Me", by James Gang from Newborn
 "Come with Me", by Jamie-Lynn Sigler from Here to Heaven
 "Come with Me", by Jay Sean from Me Against Myself
 "Come with Me", by John Mayall from Bottom Line
 "Come with Me", by Kathryn Williams and Neill MacColl from Two
 "Come with Me", by Rare Earth from Ma
 "Come with Me", by Special D. from Reckless
 "Come with Me", by Steve Aoki from Wonderland
 "Come with Me", by Stevie B from In My Eyes
 "Come with Me", by Zwan from Mary Star of the Sea
 "Come with Me (Rabbittland)", a song by Eddie Rabbitt from Songs from Rabbittland
 "Come With Me", song by Philippine hip-hop group, Ex Battalion
 "Come With Me", by Lorenz Hart from The Boys from Syracuse